Associazione Sportiva Dilettantistica Angelo Cristofaro, or simply Angelo Cristofaro, is an Italian association football club, based in Oppido Lucano, Basilicata. Angelo Cristofaro currently plays in Eccellenza Basilicata.

History 
The club was founded in 1950.

Serie D 
In the season 2010–11 it was promoted from Eccellenza Basilicata to Serie D, but it was immediately relegated in the following season.

Colors and badge 
The team's colors are green and white.

External links 
 Official Site

Football clubs in Basilicata
Association football clubs established in 1950
1950 establishments in Italy